Amalda rubiginosa is a species of sea snail, a marine gastropod mollusk in the family Ancillariidae.

Subspecies
 Amalda rubiginosa albocallosa (Lischke, C.E., 1873) 
 Amalda rubiginosa rubiginosa (Swainson, W.A., 1823)

Description

Distribution
This species is distributed along Vietnam, China, Taiwan and Japan.

References

rubiginosa
Gastropods described in 1823